The Planning (Listed Buildings and Conservation Areas) Act 1990 is an Act of Parliament of the United Kingdom that altered the laws on granting of planning permission for building works, notably including those of the listed building system in England and Wales.

Secondary Legislation
 
The Planning (Listed Buildings and Conservation Areas) (Amendment No. 2) England) Regulations 2009 were made on 6 October 2009 and came into force on 2 November 2009.  They amend The Planning (Listed Buildings and Conservation Areas) (England) Regulations 1990 as amended (‘the 1990 Regulations’), by substituting Schedule 4 of the 1990 Regulations (notices that a building has become listed or that a building has ceased to be listed), to reflect the fact that Historic England now compiles lists of buildings of special architectural or historic interest and the Secretary of State (SoS) is responsible for approving them.

External links

United Kingdom planning law
United Kingdom Acts of Parliament 1990
Town and country planning in Wales
Acts of the Parliament of the United Kingdom concerning England and Wales
Town and country planning in England
1990 in England
1990 in Wales
Architectural conservation
Historic preservation legislation
Conservation in the United Kingdom